NGC 7083 is an unbarred spiral galaxy located about 134 million light-years away in the constellation of Indus. It is also classified as a flocculent spiral galaxy.  NGC 7083 was discovered by astronomer James Dunlop on August 28, 1826.

SN2009hm
On July 17, 2009 a supernova of type Ib was discovered in NGC 7083.

See also 
 List of NGC objects (7001–7840)
 NGC 4414

References

External links 

Unbarred spiral galaxies
Flocculent spiral galaxies
Indus (constellation)
7083
67023
Astronomical objects discovered in 1826